Josefin Brink (born 1969) is a Swedish Left Party politician. She has been a member of the Riksdag since 2006. She married Åsa Brunius on 10 July 2011

References

External links
Josefin Brink at the Riksdag website

Members of the Riksdag from the Left Party (Sweden)
Living people
1969 births
Women members of the Riksdag
Lesbian politicians
Swedish LGBT politicians
21st-century Swedish women politicians
LGBT legislators